Marcos Abel Flores Benard (born 23 October 1985) is a retired Argentine professional footballer who last played for, and captained, Adelaide City.

Biography

Unión de Santa Fe
On 17 April 2004, Flores made his senior debut for Argentine club Unión de Santa Fe as a 67th-minute substitute for Miguel Sebastián Garcia and scored his first goal in the 89th minute of the same match.

Newell's Old Boys
In 2006, Flores was transferred to Newell's Old Boys but was loaned back to Unión de Santa Fe for a one-year period.

Curicó Unido
After returning to Newell's Old Boys, Flores was finally transferred to the Chilean Primera División club Curicó Unido.

Adelaide United
It was revealed in June 2009, that Australian A-League club Adelaide United had approached Flores for the 2009–10 A-League season, but the negotiations collapsed, citing Flores' desire to remain in South America. On 8 December 2009, Flores signed with Adelaide United and was named as part of the club's squad for the 2010 AFC Champions League. Flores was officially revealed by the club on 11 January 2010.

Flores was then registered as an injury replacement player for fellow import Cristiano and made his debut as a 60th-minute substitute for Adelaide United in their 2–0 win against Brisbane Roar on 6 February 2010. Flores impressed at Adelaide and gained instant legendary status by the Adelaide United fans. Flores provided the team with the playmaker position, and showcased skills and technique rarely seen in the A-League. Flores added aggression and stamina to his game since coming to the A-League.

Flores scored four A-League goal of the season contenders in the 2010–11 season. Flores' form at Adelaide attracted overseas attention, with J-League club Urawa Red Diamonds and aspiring MLS club New York Cosmos. On 21 January 2011, Flores scored his first A-league hat-trick for Adelaide in their record 8–1 win over North Queensland Fury. Flores won the Johnny Warren player of the year award for the 2010–11 season. Adelaide offered Flores a three-year deal worth $320,000 a season, which would have made him the highest paid player in the club's history.

Henan Jianye
Flores announced his transfer to Chinese Super League club Henan Jianye on 26 June 2011, where he was set to earn $2.4 million over a three-year period. The transfer fee was said to be worth $500,000. Flores made his debut for Henan Jianye as a second-half substitute on 10 July 2011 in an away 0–0 draw against Changchun Yatai in the Chinese Super League. His contract was terminated by mutual consent at 21 June 2012. Flores stated that he was interested in coming back to Australia, preferably Adelaide United, but a move was halted due to salary cap reasons.

Melbourne Victory
On 4 July 2012, it was announced that Marcos Flores had signed with A-League club Melbourne Victory on a two-year deal worth around $1 million.

He made his debut in round 1 of the A-League against cross town rivals Melbourne Heart on 5 October 2012. Flores scored his first ever Melbourne Victory goal on 5 November 2012, in a game against Wellington Phoenix. Flores was released by Melbourne Victory on 5 July 2013, becoming a free agent.

Central Coast Mariners
Shortly after his release, he was signed by the Central Coast Mariners on a one-year contract. He was seriously injured, suffering an Anterior cruciate ligament tear, and was put out for the rest of the season. On 29 March 2014 the Mariners announced he would not be re-signed for the following season.

Newcastle Jets
On 9 June 2014, it was announced that Flores will play for the Newcastle Jets in the upcoming Hyundai A-League season. Marcos scored his first goal for the Newcastle Jets against the Western Sydney Wanderers in the 27th minute in a 1-1 draw.

On 15 January 2015, Flores' contract with the Jets was mutually terminated, to allow Flores to move to an overseas football club.

Jacksonville Armada
After being released by the Newcastle Jets, Flores signed with NASL team Jacksonville Armada FC. The Armada's General Manager, Dario Sala, flew out to Australia to complete the signing of Flores on 22 January 2015. Flores was released by Jacksonville in November 2015.

Curico Unido
On January 30 Marcos joined Curico Unido unfortunately things didn't work out and he only made a few starts and a few off the bench. He also sat on the bench and wasn't in the squad for most of the season. On the 2nd of August Marcos got released.

Persib Bandung
On August 30, 2016 Marcos signed a 4-months deal with Indonesia Soccer Championship A side Persib Bandung. He eventually got his debut on September 18 in an away match against Bali United.

Adelaide City
On 17 January 2019, Flores signed a 2 year deal with National Premier League side Adelaide City.

On 15 May 2020, Flores announced his retirement from football.

Career statistics

1 – includes Chilean Primera División play-offs

Honours
 Johnny Warren Medal: 2010–11
 A-League Foreign Player of the Year: 2010–11
 Adelaide United Player's Player of the Year: 2010–11
 A-League Goal of the Year: 2012-13

References

External links
 Central Coast Mariners profile 
 
 Ultimate A-League profile
 

1985 births
Living people
Association football midfielders
Argentine footballers
Argentine expatriate footballers
Argentine Primera División players
A-League Men players
People from Reconquista, Santa Fe
Newell's Old Boys footballers
Unión de Santa Fe footballers
Curicó Unido footballers
Adelaide United FC players
Melbourne Victory FC players
Expatriate footballers in Chile
Expatriate soccer players in Australia
Henan Songshan Longmen F.C. players
Expatriate footballers in China
Central Coast Mariners FC players
Newcastle Jets FC players
Jacksonville Armada FC players
Chinese Super League players
North American Soccer League players
Persib Bandung players
Bali United F.C. players
Adelaide City FC players
Marquee players (A-League Men)
Chilean Primera División players
Sportspeople from Santa Fe Province